The Jaunpur–Dobhi–Aunrihar line is an operating railway line that comes under the jurisdiction of North Eastern Railway zone of Indian Railways in Uttar Pradesh, India. It lies on the Gangetic plain.

In this route Dobhi Junction is the famous station and medium revenue station in Varanasi railway division of North Eastern Railway zone.

Shed/Depot
Currently, In this line, it has two types of sheds such as:

Aunrihar DMU Shed
Union Minister of State for Railways Manoj Sinha handed over two schemes worth Rs 153 crore to his parliamentary constituency Ghazipur.

Saiyedpur E-Loco-Shed
Saiyedpur Bhitri E-loco Shed is 6 km from Aunrihar Junction and 0.5 km From Saiyedpur Bhitri railway station Minister of State for Railways and Minister of State (Independent Charge) Manoj Sinha said that after the formation of AC Electric Locoshed, the name of the Saiyedpur Bhitri, known for the article of Emperor Skanda Gupta, will become immortal in Indian Railways. The Minister of State for Railways was speaking at the foundation stone laying ceremony of AC Locoshed of 100-Loco capacity at Saidpur Bhitari railway station located on Saturday. Said that 100 locos will be maintained here in the initial phase. Later it will be made of 200 people capacity. This E-Loco Shed is under construction. After complete it will serve the Varanasi Division of NER (Gorakhpur) but also whole India.

Technical information
Using  broad gauge, the rolling stock on the line includes the diesel locomotives; P7, P12, WDP-4, WDG-4 and electric locomotive;.WAP-7, WAP-4. Since March 2019 the main line is electrified. Double line electrified From Aunrihar to Dobhi was completed in October 2021 and Dobhi-Kerakat Muftiganj Line doubling and electrification completed in April 2022. The maximum operating speed is 110 km/h.

Stations
  (ARJ)
  (FRDH) 
  (DDNA) 
  (DHE)
 *  (KCT)
 Gangauli halt (GNGL) 
  (MFJ) 
  (YDV) 
  (JNU)

Train service
Here there are some trains passing through this line:
 Suhaildev Express
 Barauni–Gondia Express
 Loknayak Express
 Bandra–Ghazipur Express
 Sadbhavna Express
75111 and 75112 EMU passenger train from Gajipur city to Prayagraj junction

References

External links
 Arrivals at ARJ/Aunrihar Junction, India Rail Info
 Arrivals at KCT/Kirakat India Rail Info

Railway lines opened in 1904
5 ft 6 in gauge railways in India

Transport in Jaunpur, Uttar Pradesh
Railway lines in Uttar Pradesh